The fourth season of the American reality competition television series World of Dance premiered on May 26, 2020, on NBC. Ne-Yo, Jennifer Lopez, and Derek Hough returned as the judges for their fourth consecutive seasons. Access Hollywood co-host Scott Evans returned as host for his second season.

Production

Format changes
The Qualifiers are no longer held in the studio; instead, it was recorded in a warehouse with no live audience. In addition, it was disguised as a final producers' auditions. Contestants learn that it is the Qualifiers only upon entering the audition room.

The scoring system was abolished in favor of votes, this applied for the Qualifiers and Duels. Contestants need at least two yeses to proceed to the Duels. Judges may also cast a callback vote which gives the contestants a final chance to perform again to advance to the Duels.

The team divisions have now been merged within the Junior and Upper divisions, so there are now only 2 divisions.

In the Duels, contestants no longer choose their opponent. Instead, the judges pick who they are battling and is revealed only upon entering the room. Moreover, a guest judge picks who will perform head-to-head in the Redemption Duels.

Judges, host, and mentors

Jennifer Lopez, Ne-Yo, and Derek Hough returned as the judges for their fourth consecutive seasons. Access Live co-host, Scott Evans returned as the host for a second consecutive season.

For the first time in show history there were no guest mentors at any stage of the competition.

Dancers

Upper (18 and over)

Junior (Under 18)

The Qualifiers
The Qualifiers started on May 26, 2020. In season 4, the contestants need to get at least 2 yeses to advance to the Duels instead of the judges scoring the points to the contestant. Contestants who are given a callback vote are given another chance to perform.

The Callbacks
The Callbacks occurred on June 23, 2020. The 10 callbacks performed for one of the four spots to head to the Duels.

The Duels
In the Duels, contestants no longer choose their opponent. Instead, the judges pick who they are battling and is revealed only upon entering the room. Moreover, a guest judge, Stephen "tWitch" Boss, picks who will perform head-to-head in the Redemption Duels.

Oxygen defeated Styles & Emma in the Upper Redemption Duel to advance. The Young Cast defeated James and Harris in the Junior Redemption Duel to advance.

Redemption

The Semi Finals
In the Semi Finals, 6 acts per episode compete for 2 spots in the World Final. In each episode, there are 3 Upper Division and 3 Junior Division Acts.

For the first time, the acts perform on the World of Dance stage. Also, the scoring system returns in this round.

World Final 
The World Final was taped without the studio audience due to the COVID-19 Pandemic.

Highest Scoring Dances

Ratings

References

2020 American television seasons
Dance competition television shows